Molagavalli is a village in Kurnool district of the Indian state of Andhra Pradesh. It is located in Alur Mandal of Adoni revenue division.

Geography 

References

Villages in Kurnool district